Richmond-Cape Breton West was a provincial electoral district in Nova Scotia, Canada, that elected two members to the Nova Scotia House of Assembly. It existed from 1925 to 1933, at which point the district was divided into two distinct electoral districts: Richmond and Cape Breton West.

It elected two members through Plurality block voting.

Members of the Legislative Assembly
Source:

Election results

1925 general election

1928 general election

References

Former provincial electoral districts of Nova Scotia